{{Infobox book series
| name             = For Dummies
| title_orig       = 
| image            = For Dummies logo.svg
| image_caption    = 
| author           = Various
| illustrator      = Rich Tennant (UK editions use Ed McLachlan)
| cover_artist     = 
| translator       = 
| country          = United States
| language         = English
| genre            = Instructional/reference
| publisher        = IDG Books/Hungry Minds. Later Wiley.
| pub_date         = October 1, 1991 (DOS For Dummies) 
| english_pub_date = 
| media_type       = 
| preceded by      = 
| followed by      = 
| website          = 
}}For Dummies is an extensive series of instructional reference books which are intended to present non-intimidating guides for readers new to the various topics covered.  The series has been a worldwide success with editions in numerous languages.

The books are an example of a media franchise, consistently sporting a distinctive cover—usually yellow and black with a triangular-headed cartoon figure known as the "Dummies Man", and an informal, blackboard-style logo. Prose is simple and direct; bold icons, such as a piece of string tied around an index finger, are placed in the margin to indicate particularly important passages.

Almost all Dummies books are organized around sections called "parts", which are groups of related chapters. Parts are almost always preceded by a Rich Tennant comic that refers to some part of the subject under discussion, though the comics were discontinued in 2012. Sometimes the same Tennant drawing reappears in another Dummies book with a new caption.

Another constant in the Dummies series is "The Part of Tens", a section at the end of the books where lists of 10 items are included. They are usually resources for further study and sometimes also include amusing bits of information that do not fit readily elsewhere.

 History 
The first title, DOS For Dummies, was written by Dan Gookin and published in November 1991 by IDG Books. DOS For Dummies became popular due to the rarity of beginner-friendly materials for using DOS. The Windows title written by Andy Rathbone was soon released. While initially the series focused solely on software and technology topics, it later branched out to more general-interest titles, with topics as diverse as Acne For Dummies, Chess For Dummies, Fishing For Dummies and many other topics. The series is now published by John Wiley & Sons, Inc., which acquired Hungry Minds (the new name for IDG Books as of 2000) in early 2001.

Notable For Dummies books include:
 DOS For Dummies, the first, published in 1991, whose first printing was just 7,500 copies
 Windows for Dummies, asserted to be the best-selling computer book of all time, with more than 15 million sold
 L'Histoire de France Pour Les Nuls, the top-selling non-English For Dummies title, with more than 400,000 sold

 Expansions and alternative versions 
Several related series have been published, including Dummies 101, with step-by-step tutorials in a large-format book (now discontinued); More ... for Dummies, which are essentially sequels to the first ... For Dummies book on the subject; and For Dummies Quick Reference, which is a condensed alphabetical reference to the subject. A larger All-in-One Desk Reference format offers more comprehensive coverage of the subject, normally running about 750 pages.  Also, some books in the series are smaller and do not follow the same formatting style as the others.

Wiley has also launched an interactive online course with Learnstreet based on its popular book, Java for Dummies, 5th edition.

A spin-off board game, Crosswords for Dummies, was produced in the late 1990s.  The game is similar to Scrabble, but instead of letter tiles, players draw short strips of cardboard containing pre-built English words.  The words vary in length from three to seven letters, with more points acquired for playing longer words. Another board game, SAT Game For Dummies, is used in SAT preparation. A Chess for Dummies was made, a black-and-yellow chessboard with a picture of a piece, along with a summary of how the piece moves, printed its starting positions, although there is a book with the same name.

In 2009, French publisher Anuman Interactive obtained the digital exploitation rights and launched many applications based on the For Dummies collection, such as Home Design 3D For Dummies and History For Dummies.

 See also 

 Complete Idiot's Guides – a similar series of how-to books from Alpha Books
 FabJob – a similar series of how-to-books for starting a business or dream career
 Pour les nuls, a similar series in French
 Teach Yourself – another similar series published by Hodder Headline
 Very Short Introductions'', a similar series of introductory books published by the Oxford University Press

References

External links 
 
 
 Titles and Description of all For Dummies titles 

Handbooks and manuals
Series of books
2001 mergers and acquisitions
Book series introduced in 1991
Study guides